The 2011 European Under-18 Rugby Union Championship was the eighth annual international rugby union competition for Under 18 national rugby union teams in Europe. The event was organised by rugby's European governing body, the FIRA – Association of European Rugby (FIRA-AER). The competition was contested by 28 men's junior national teams and will be held in April 2011. It was hosted by the French region of Armagnac and Bigorre. The tournament was won by the under-18 team of Ireland, who took out the title for the first time, beating England in the final. For the first time, France did not reach the championship game and finished in fourth place only.

The tournament's defending champion was France, who had won five European championships and the last four in a row. The 2011 edition of the competition saw the introduction of an elite division, above division one, made up of four teams, France, England, Wales and Ireland. The divisions below remained unchanged. It marked the first time that all countries participating in the Six Nations Championship send a team to the European championship.

It was sponsored by French company Justin Bridou and therefore officially called the 2011 Justin Bridou European Under-18 Rugby Union Championship.

Overview

History
The European Under-18 Rugby Union Championship was first held in 2004, in Treviso, Italy. It replaced the previously held European Under-18 Emergent Nations Championship, which had first been held in 2000. The first championship in 2004 was won by France.

The following two championships, held in Lille, France, in 2005 and again in Treviso in 2006, were won by England. Alternating between France and Italy, the next four championships were held in Biarritz, Treviso again, Toulon and once more in Treviso in 2010. All four were won by France, but of Europe's top rugby playing nations, England, Wales and Scotland did not take part in the 2010 edition.

Format
The 2011 edition saw the introduction of an Elite division, consisting of four teams, two of which, England and Wales, had not taken part in the 2010 competition or, in the case of Wales, never taken part in the European championship.

Below the elite level, the championship was organised in First, Second and Third Divisions, with First being the highest and Third the lowest. Each division consisted of eight teams and each team played three competition games, with a quarter-final, semi-final and final/placing game. The quarter-finals were played according to a seeding list, with the winners moving on to the first to fourth place semi-finals while the losers would enter the fifth to eighth place semi-finals.

The winner of the Elite division, Ireland, was crowned European champions while the fourth placed team was to be relegated to the First division. Similarly, the winner of the Second and Third divisions would move up a division for 2012 while the last placed teams would be relegated.

To determine the four teams playing in the Elite Division, a qualifying tournament was held between the Six Nations U-18 sides in late February and early March, with the teams drawn into two groups of three teams each. France and England won their groups, with Wales and Ireland finishing second, qualifying all four teams for the Elite Division. Italy and Scotland finished third, placing them in the First Division. For Italy, this was still a bonus as it obtained the second seed for the division, behind Scotland. After an unsuccessful 2010 tournament, where the team had finished only fifth, it would have been entitled to only the fifth seed otherwise. Scotland made a return to the European championship for the first time since 2006.

Venues
The games of the 2011 championship were played at venues in Armagnac and Bigorre, two regions in southern France. The first round of games in all divisions except the elite one was played on 16 April 2011. The elite division played their first games in Auch the following day. The second round was played on 19 April while the finals for all divisions were held on 22 and 23 April, with Division two and three playing on the 22 and the Elite and First Division on the 23.

The venues for the Elite Group where:
 Auch
 Tarbes

The venues for the first round were:
 Condom
 Eauze
 Fleurance
 Lombez
 Magnoac
 Vic-en-Bigorre

The venues for the second round were:
 Gimont
 Lourdes
 Masseube
 Miélan
 Ossun
 Vic-Fezensac

The venues for the third round were:
 Bagnères
 Capvern
 L'Isle-Jourdain
 Laloubère
 Lannemezan
 Louey
 Sémléac

D Division
The D division forms the fourth level, below the Third division, of European Under-18 rugby. In 2011, only three teams compete at this level, at a separate tournament. It consists of the teams of Israel, Croatia and Bosnia & Herzegovina. The tournament was held independently of the other divisions on 14 April at Sinj, Croatia and won by the home nation.

Teams and standings
The participating teams and their divisions are in order of their ranking after the tournament:

Games
The scheduled games:

Elite Division
The games of the elite division:

First Division
The games of the first division:

Championship

Relegation

Second Division
The games of the second division:

Championship

Relegation

Third Division
The games of the third division:

Championship

Relegation

European Championship final
The European Championship final was held on 23 April at 18:30 at Tarbes and was broadcast live on Eurosport 2. The final was played in wet conditions and a well organised Ireland side went up 11-3 by half time. England's head coach, John Fletcher, conceded that it was a well-deserved Irish victory but that the game was an important lesson to learn and would help his players in their future development. For Ireland, which was, for the first time, represented by a schools team rather than a Club XV, captain Luke McGrath was the most influential figure on the field, scoring twelve points.

References

External links
 FIRA-AER official website
  2010 European Under-18 Rugby Union Championship official website

2011
Europe
2010–11 in European rugby union
2010–11 in French rugby union
International rugby union competitions hosted by France